The Year 01 is a French comedy film, directed by Jacques Doillon, Alain Resnais and Jean Rouch released in 1973. It is based on the eponymous comic strip by Gébé and has gained cult film status.

Synopsis 
The film narrates a utopian abandonment, consensual and festive of the market economy and high productivity. The population decides on a number of resolutions, beginning with "Let's stop everything," and the second "After a period of total stoppage, let's bring back — reluctantly — just the services and products we can't do without. Probably : water to drink, electricity for reading at night, the radio to say 'This is not the end of the world, this is Year 1, and now a page of Celestial Mechanics." The implementation of these resolutions is the first day of a new era, Year 1. L'An 01 is emblematic of the challenge of the 1970s and covers such diverse topics as ecology, negation of authority, free love, communal living, rejection of private property and labor.

Cast 
More than 300 people. Notable people include

 Daniel Auteuil
 Josiane Balasko
 François Béranger
 Isabelle de Botton
 Madeleine Bouchez
 Romain Bouteille
 Cabu
 Jacques Canselier
 François Cavanna
 Professeur Choron
 Christian Clavier
 Coluche
 Christine Dejoux
 Albert Delpy
 Gérard Depardieu
 Delfeil de Ton
 Charlotte Dubreuil
 Jean-Paul Farré
 Lee Falk
 Marcel Gassouk
 Gébé
 Marcel Gotlib
 Henri Guybet
 Jacques Higelin
 Gérard Jugnot
 Nelly Kaplan
 Daniel Laloux
 Martin Lamotte
 Patrice Leconte
 Stan Lee
 Thierry Lhermitte
 René Marjac
 Miou-Miou
 Patrice Minet
 David Pascal
 Marie Pillet
 Daniel Prévost
 Maud Rayer
 Jacques Robiolles
 Alain Scoff
 Susan Shapiro
 Philippe Starck
 Jean-Paul Tribout
 Frederic Tuten
 Georges Wolinski
 Guillaume Weill-Raynal

References

External links 
 
 The film L'An 01 is available (duration de 1:24:15 on the website peertube.gegeweb.eu)

1973 films
French satirical films
1970s French-language films
French comedy films
1973 comedy films
French political satire films
Films based on French comics
Films directed by Jacques Doillon
Films directed by Alain Resnais
Films directed by Jean Rouch
Films about criticism and refusal of work
1970s French films